Thierry Marie (born 25 June 1963) is a French former cyclist. Marie often performed well in prologue stages: he won the Tour de France prologue three times in his career, and because of that he wore the yellow jersey in those three years, for seven days in total. He also competed in the team time trial event at the 1984 Summer Olympics. On stage six of the 1991 Tour de France Marie rode alone for six hours and 234 km to win the stage and set the record for the longest post-war successful breakaway.

Major results

1984
 1st Paris–Roubaix Espoirs
 5th Tour de Normandie
1985
 1st  Overall Tour du Limousin
 1st Duo Normand (with Charly Mottet)
 1st Stage 3 Grand Prix du Midi Libre
 1st Prologue Tour de l'Avenir
 2nd Grand Prix des Nations
 5th GP Ouest–France
 6th Overall Circuit de la Sarthe
 7th Grand Prix de Rennes
 9th Paris–Tours
 9th Critérium des As
 10th Paris–Camembert
1986
 Tour de France
1st Prologue & Stage 2 (TTT)
Held  after Prologue & Stages 2–3
Held  after Prologue 
 Vuelta a España
1st Prologue
Held  after Prologue
 1st Stage 2b Volta a Catalunya
 3rd Overall Tour de l'Aude
1st Prologue 
 3rd Paris–Camembert
 4th Overall Three Days of De Panne
1987
 1st  Overall Tour d'Armorique
1st Prologue
 1st Duo Normand (with Gérard Rué)
1988
 1st  Overall Ronde van Nederland
 1st  Overall Circuit de la Sarthe
1st Stage 1 (ITT)
 1st Duo Normand (with Philippe Bouvatier)
 1st Stage 20 Tour de France
 1st Stage 2 Subida a Arrate
 3rd Overall Tour d'Armorique
1st Stage 3b (ITT)
 3rd Trofeo Baracchi (with Charly Mottet)
 3rd Grand Prix de Denain
 8th Overall Four Days of Dunkirk
1989
 1st Trofeo Baracchi (with Laurent Fignon)
 1st Baden-Baden (with Laurent Fignon)
 1st Prologue Paris–Nice
 1st Prologue Tour of Belgium
 1st Stage 2 (TTT) Tour de France
 2nd Overall Ronde van Nederland
1st Stage 2b (ITT)
 2nd Overall Four Days of Dunkirk
1st Stages 1 & 6a (ITT)
 2nd Grand Prix de Denain
 2nd Grand Prix de la Libération
 4th Grand Prix Eddy Merckx
 9th Overall Three Days of De Panne
1990
 1st Paris–Camembert
 Tour de France
1st Prologue 
Held  &  after Prologue  
 3rd Overall Ronde van Nederland
1st Stage 5 (ITT)
 3rd Overall Four Days of Dunkirk
1st Stages 3 (ITT) & 7 
 3rd Overall Circuit de la Sarthe
 5th Trofeo Baracchi (with Gérard Rué)
 9th Grand Prix Eddy Merckx
1991
 1st Polynormande
 Tour de France
1st Prologue & Stage 6 
Held  after Prologue & Stages 6–7
Held  after Prologue 
Held  after Stage 6 
 1st Stage 1 (ITT) Critérium du Dauphiné Libéré
 1st Prologue Paris–Nice
 1st Prologue Grand Prix du Midi Libre
 1st Stage 4 (ITT) Tour d'Armorique
 2nd Overall Tour de l'Oise
1st Stage 4 (ITT)
 2nd Chrono des Herbiers
 3rd Tour de Vendée
 4th Overall Ronde van Nederland
 5th Overall Circuit de la Sarthe
1992
 1st  Overall Tour de l'Oise
1st Stage 4 (ITT)
 Giro d'Italia
1st Prologue 
Held  after Prologue & Stage 1
Held  after Prologue
 1st Stage 18 Tour de France
 2nd Road race, National Road Championships
 2nd Overall Ronde van Nederland
 3rd Overall Three Days of De Panne
1st Stage 1b (ITT)
 3rd Circuit de l'Aulne
 3rd Grand Prix Eddy Merckx
 7th Trofeo Pantalica
 8th Chrono des Herbiers
1993
 1st  Overall Tour du Poitou Charentes et de la Vienne
1st Stage 5 (ITT)
 1st Stage 4 Vuelta a Burgos
 3rd Telekom Grand Prix (with Pascal Lino)
 9th Grand Prix de Denain
1994
 2nd Chrono des Herbiers
 3rd Grand Prix des Nations
 4th Overall Four Days of Dunkirk
 5th Grand Prix Eddy Merckx
 6th Overall Three Days of De Panne
 6th Overall Tour de l'Oise
 6th Telekom Grand Prix (with Thomas Davy
 7th Time trial, UCI Road World Championships
1995
 1st  Time trial, National Road Championships
 1st  Overall Circuit de la Sarthe
1st Stage 2
 1st La Côte Picarde
 1st Châteauroux Classic
 1st Stage 1b (ITT) Route du Sud
 4th Overall Tour de l'Oise
 4th Telekom Grand Prix (with Laurent Madouas)
 5th Paris–Camembert
 7th Cholet-Pays de la Loire
1996
 2nd Route Adélie
 7th Tour de Vendée

Grand Tour general classification results timeline

References

External links

 

1963 births
Living people
Cyclists from Normandy
French male cyclists
Tour de France prologue winners
French Tour de France stage winners
French Giro d'Italia stage winners
Olympic cyclists of France
Cyclists at the 1984 Summer Olympics
Sportspeople from Calvados (department)